Kasu Iddone Basu is a 2003 Indian Kannada comedy film starring Jaggesh and his younger brother Komal opposite Radhika Chaudhari in the lead roles with an ensemble supporting cast including Doddanna, Bank Janardhan, Chitra Shenoy, A. R. Babu, Sridevi, Mandeep Roy and M. S. Karanth. The film directed by A. R. Babu has musical score by V. Manohar. It marked the second collaboration between Jaggesh and N. Kumar after Yaardo Duddu Yellammana Jathre released in the same year. Kasu Iddone Basu was released on 29 August 2003.

Cast 
 Jaggesh
 Komal
 Radhika Chaudhari
 Hema Choudhary as a Guest Role
 Doddanna
 Bank Janardhan
 Chitra Shenoy
  A. R. Babu
  Sridevi
 Mandeep Roy
 M. S. Karanth
 Pushpa Swamy
 Killer Venkatesh
 Keerthiraj
 Roopa
 Budal Krishnamurthy

Soundtrack 
The music is composed by V. Manohar.

Release and reception 
The film was originally slated for release on 7 August but was later postponed to 29 August due to a tussle between the producer and the exhibitors.

A critic from Filmibeat called the film "logicless".

References

External links 
 Kasu Iddone Basu at Gaana

2003 films
2000s Kannada-language films